Shree Pritam is an Indian music director and singer who has performed music with Bappi Lahiri. Pritam composed songs for Indo-Bangladeshi, Bangladeshi and Indian Bengali films. In Recent year 2018 he composed for Ami Neta Hobo, a Bangladeshi film.

Discography
 Bikram Singha: The Lion Is Back (2012)
 Idiot (2012)
 Khoka 420 (2013)
 Khiladi (2013)
 Ami Neta Hobo (2018)
 Tui Amar Rani (2019)

References

External links
 
 Shree Pritam in Gomolo
 filmiclub.com
 
 
 Linkedin.com

Living people
Bengali musicians
Musicians from Kolkata
Indian film score composers
Indian male film score composers
Year of birth missing (living people)